Volcano F (also known as Volcano 0403-091) is a submarine volcano in the Tonga Islands of the South Pacific Ocean. It is part of the highly active Kermadec-Tonga subduction zone and its associated volcanic arc, which extends from New Zealand north-northeast to Fiji, and is formed by the subduction of the Pacific Plate under the Indo-Australian Plate. 

The volcano was first mapped in 2004, and assigned the name "Volcano F". It consists of a large (8.7 x 6 km) caldera with a depth of 670 - 720 m. The entire volcano rises  from the sea-floor.

Eruption history
The volcano erupted in September 2001, resulting in an eruption column and a pumice raft which later reached the coast of Australia.

In August 2019 a  pumice raft was discovered floating in the Pacific Ocean in Tonga. The pumice raft was observed by numerous yachts and reached Fiji in September. Discoloured water and analysis of the drift path using satellite imagery showed that the raft had originated from an eruption of Volcano F beginning on 6 August 2019. The eruption was preceded by a series of earthquakes on 5 August, and ceased on 8 August.

See also
List of volcanoes in Tonga

References

Volcanoes of Tonga
Submarine calderas
Vavaʻu